{{Infobox television
| image                = Hanging_With_title_card_2018.jpg
| image_size           = 260
| image_alt            = The title "Hanging With" written in dark blue lettering against a fluorescent light blue background. The title is outlined with a box, underneath the logo for Disney.
| caption              = Hanging With title card used from 2018 onwards
| alt_name             = Hanging with Adam & Naomi (2013–15)Hanging with Adam & Ash (2015–16)
| genre                = Children's
| creator              = Amy McCulloch
| director             = Amy McCulloch(2013–15)Vanessa Collier(2015–16)
| developer            =
| presenter            = Ashleigh WellsTim MatthewsSiena ElchaarJoel MaguireElla Victoria
| starring             = 
| voices               = 
| narrated             = 
| theme_music_composer = 
| opentheme            = "Take Me Away"by Clooney (2013–17)"Feelin' Like"by Ms. Triniti (2018–present)
| endtheme             = 
| composer             = 
| country              = Australia
| language             = English
| num_series           = 7
| num_episodes         = 
| list_episodes        = 
| executive_producer   = Amy McCullochVanessa Collier
| producer             = 
| editor               = 
| location             = Chief Entertainment, Sydney, New South Wales
| cinematography       = 
| camera               = 
| runtime              = 2–3 minutes
| company              = 
| network              = Disney Channel
| picture_format       = 576i (SDTV)
| audio_format         = Stereo
| first_aired          = 
| last_aired           = 
| preceded_by          = 
| followed_by          = 
| related              =  
}}Hanging With is an Australian children's television series which aired on Disney Channel from 2013 to 2019.

It premiered on 15 July 2013 as a short-form series dispersed between programs. The variety entertainment series would air at 4:30pm (AEST) weekdays with hosts who act as the faces of Disney Channel. The hosts presented Disney programming news, along with celebrity interviews, sketches, and other segments including crafts, games, quizzes and challenges. The hosts also produced factual field stories filmed outside of the studio. Its final hosts were Ashleigh Wells and Tim Matthews, along with supporting presenters Siena Elchaar, Joel Maguire and Ella Victoria.

The program typically aired for 36 weeks of the year, with regular breaks throughout. The final episode aired on 20 September 2019, ahead of the closure of the network in 2020.

History
The show was originally formatted as a short-form series titled Hanging with Adam & Naomi, and was hosted by Adam Roberts with Naomi Sequeira, who had together previously presented the ASTRA-nominated program Backstage Pass and other Disney Channel interstitials. Sequeira departed the program in 2015 and was replaced by Ashleigh Wells, who had previously worked on the channel. The series was renamed to Hanging with Adam & Ash accordingly.

Beginning 13 February 2017, the short-form series was expanded to a new runtime of 30 minutes, and retitled Hanging With. Roberts and Wells continued as the primary hosts, being joined by various other Disney Channel personalities. Additional presenters included Ella Victoria (The Style Edit), Grace Pitts and Joel Maguire (Radio Disney Insider), Emma Graham and Jackson Ryan (Gamefest), Siena Elchaar, Chantel Cofie and Milly Alcock (B.F. Chefs), and Georgia-May Davis (Backstage Pass). In November 2017, Hanging With returned to its original short-form format but retained the additional presenters.

An additional 30-minute weekly episode, titled Hanging With: Weekend Hangout, aired from January 2018 to April 2019. This special episode aired on Saturdays and presented the highlights of the week's segments.

Ahead of the closure of Disney Channel in early 2020, Hanging With aired its final episode on 20 September 2019.

Hosts

Main hosts
 

Notes
 Naomi Sequeira returned as a guest several times between 2015 and 2017 to promote her program The Evermoor Chronicles and from the set of her movie Rip Tide. 
 Ashleigh Wells joined the show as an entertainment reporter on 25 August 2014.

Supporting hosts
 Georgia-May Davis (2017–18)
 Siena Elchaar (2017–19)
 Joel Maguire (2017–19)
 Jackson Ryan (2017–18)
 Ella Victoria (2017–19)

Time slots
 From 2013 to 2017, Hanging With'' aired at 4:30pm (AEST) weekdays. The program returned to this slot in April 2019.
 The program aired at 4:00pm (AEST) weekdays from November 2017 to July 2018.
 The program aired at 5:00pm (AEST) weekdays from July 2018 to April 2019.

Awards and nominations

Notes

See also
 List of longest-running Australian television series

References

External links
Archived Hanging With Site

Disney Channels Worldwide original programming
Television programming blocks in Australia
Australian children's television series
2013 Australian television series debuts